88th Brigade may refer to:
 88th Separate Rifle Brigade (Soviet Union/Korea/China)
 88th Mixed Brigade (Spain)
 88th Brigade (United Kingdom)
 88th Brigade Support Battalion (United States)

See also

 88th Division (disambiguation)
 88th Regiment (disambiguation)